Achaea diplographa is a species of moth of the family Erebidae first described by George Hampson in 1913. It is found in the Comoros off the eastern coast of Africa.

References 

Achaea (moth)
Moths of the Comoros
Moths described in 1913